The Wairau Fault is an active dextral (right lateral) strike-slip fault in the northeastern part of South Island, New Zealand. It forms part of the Marlborough Fault System, which accommodates the transfer of displacement along the oblique convergent boundary between the Indo-Australian Plate and Pacific Plate, from the transform Alpine Fault to the Hikurangi Trench subduction zone.

Extent
Depending on the precise definition used, the Wairau Fault runs either from southern or northern end  of 'The Bends' region. In the former case it is regarded as the Wairau segment of the Alpine Fault. In the latter case it is regarded as a separate fault and runs about 100 km from near Lake Rotoiti to Cloudy Bay in the east. To the west, the fault is a single strand but near Wairau Valley township, the fault splits into two strands. These two strands continue to within about 15 km of the coast near Renwick. Further to the east only the southernmost strand can be detected. It takes its name from the Wairau River, which follows the fault trace for most of its length.

Recent seismicity
From the offset of dated river terraces a displacement of 23 m has been estimated along the Wairau Fault since about 5610 yrs BP. Trenching studies along the trace of the Wairau Fault have identified four dateable slip events within this interval, the age of latest event falls in the range 1811–2301 BP. The average recurrence interval for earthquakes along this fault is in the range 1150–1400 yrs. The estimated average slip for each event is about 6 m.

Seismic hazard
The recurrence interval of slip events estimated for the fault combined with the estimated time since the last event suggest "that the Wairau Fault is nearing the end of its interseismic period". The current estimated seismic hazard from the Wairau Fault is considered to be relatively high.

References

Seismic faults of New Zealand
Strike-slip faults